Zaira Flores Nogueras (born 4 November 1993) is a Spanish footballer who plays as a midfielder for Alhama.

Club career
Flores started her career at Barcelona B.

References

External links
Profile at La Liga

1993 births
Living people
Women's association football midfielders
Spanish women's footballers
People from Sant Joan Despí
Sportspeople from the Province of Barcelona
Footballers from Catalonia
Sportswomen from Catalonia
FC Barcelona Femení B players
FC Barcelona Femení players
FC Levante Las Planas players
RCD Espanyol Femenino players
Rayo Vallecano Femenino players
Villarreal CF (women) players
Primera División (women) players
Segunda Federación (women) players
21st-century Spanish women